Mark Snow (born Martin Fulterman; August 26, 1946) is an American composer for film and television. Among his most famous compositions is the theme music for science fiction television series The X-Files. The X Files theme tune was released as a single in the United Kingdom, where the series aired on BBC Two and BBC One, in early-1996, peaking at number two on the UK Singles Chart. Snow also wrote the music for another Chris Carter series, Millennium, and the background music scores for both shows, a total of 12 seasons.

Works

Television series

Television films

Theatrical films

Video games

Notes

References

External links
 
 GSA Music Agency representation
 ASCAP Biography 
 Interview with Randall D. Larson, Soundtrax: Episode 2008-11, 23 May 2008

1946 births
Ambient musicians
American film score composers
American television composers
Juilliard School alumni
La-La Land Records artists
Living people
American male film score composers
Male television composers
Musicians from Brooklyn
The High School of Music & Art alumni